Björn Waldegård (12 November 1943 – 29 August 2014) was a Swedish rally driver, and the winner of the inaugural World Rally Championship for drivers in 1979. His Swedish nickname was "Walle".

Career
Waldegård, who came from Rimbo, had a career that spanned four decades; he made his debut in 1962 and, after winning the Swedish Rally Championship in 1967 and '68, continued to compete at the top level until 1992 when a broken arm suffered during a crash in the 1992 Safari Rally forced his retirement. His first international victory, at the wheel of a Porsche 911, came on the 1969 Monte Carlo Rally, while his last came for Toyota on the 1990 Safari. It made him the oldest driver to win a World Rally Championship event, a record he retained until the 2022 Monte Carlo Rally.

In the mid-1970s Waldegård took part in the newborn European Championship for Rallycross Drivers with a privately entered Porsche Carrera RSR. His best overall result was to become the Runner-up to Austrian Franz Wurz, father of Alexander Wurz, of the 1974 Embassy European Rallycross Championship.

The Alitalia-backed Lancia team of the 1970s frequently choose between star drivers Waldegård and Italian frontrunner Sandro Munari. Waldegård and Munari came head to head in the 1976 Rallye Sanremo. Waldegård had a four-second lead over Munari entering the final stage, only to be forced to squander that advantage in keeping with the team's hopes for an 'equal' shootout. Waldegård, however, emerged as victor by four seconds, having disobeyed team orders and overtaken Munari – as a result, Waldegård left Lancia and joined Ford in late 1976.

Driving Ford Escort RS1800 models, Waldegård won three of the world's most punishing rallies in 1977; the East African Safari Rally, the Acropolis Rally, and the RAC Rally.

He was later victor in the inaugural World Rally Championship series in 1979 for Ford and Mercedes-Benz, beating Hannu Mikkola in the final round at the Rallye Côte d'Ivoire in the Ivory Coast, by finishing second behind his rival.

In September 2008, Waldegård took part in the Colin McRae Forest Stages Rally, a round of the Scottish Rally Championship centred in Perth in Scotland. He was one of a number of ex-world champions to take part in the event in memory of McRae, who died in 2007. On the event he drove a Porsche 911.

In addition to his rallying career, Waldegård also took part in the 1970 Targa Florio sports car endurance race on the Italian island of Sicily, the oldest motor race in the world at the time. He drove a factory supported, John Wyer-entered Porsche 908/3. The Targa Florio was more or less a rally-type race on a closed circuit made up of public roads, hence the reason for Waldegård's one-off drive with Porsche. Sharing driving duties with Briton Richard Attwood, he finished fifth.

Björn Waldegård died on 29 August 2014 of cancer at the age of 70.

International victories

WRC victories
{|class="wikitable"
!  # 
! Event
! Season
! Co-driver
! Car
|-
| 1
|  25th International Swedish Rally
| 1975
| Hans Thorszelius
| Lancia Stratos HF
|-
| 2
|  17º Rallye Sanremo
| 1975
| Hans Thorszelius
| Lancia Stratos HF
|-
| 3
|  18º Rallye Sanremo
| 1976
| Hans Thorszelius
| Lancia Stratos HF
|-
| 4
|  25th Safari Rally
| 1977
| Hans Thorszelius
| Ford Escort RS1800
|-
| 5
|  24th Acropolis Rally
| 1977
| Hans Thorszelius
| Ford Escort RS1800
|-
| 6
|  26th Lombard RAC Rally
| 1977
| Hans Thorszelius
| Ford Escort RS1800
|-
| 7
|  28th International Swedish Rally
| 1978
| Hans Thorszelius
| Ford Escort RS1800
|-
| 8
|  26th Acropolis Rally
| 1979
| Hans Thorszelius
| Ford Escort RS1800
|-
| 9
|  7ème Critérium Molson
du Québec
| 1979
| Hans Thorszelius
| Ford Escort RS1800
|-
| 10
|  12ème Rallye Côte d'Ivoire
| 1980
| Hans Thorszelius
| Mercedes 500 SLC
|-
| 11
|  12th Motogard Rally of New Zealand
| 1982
| Hans Thorszelius
| Toyota Celica 2000GT
|-
| 12
|  15ème Rallye Côte d'Ivoire
| 1983
| Hans Thorszelius
| Toyota Celica TCT
|-
| 13
|  32nd Marlboro Safari Rally
| 1984
| Hans Thorszelius
| Toyota Celica TCT
|-
| 14
|  34th Marlboro Safari Rally Kenya
| 1986
| Fred Gallagher
| Toyota Celica TCT
|-
| 15
|  18ème Rallye Côte d'Ivoire
| 1986
| Fred Gallagher
| Toyota Celica TCT
|-
| 16
|  38th Marlboro Safari Rally Kenya
| 1990
| Fred Gallagher
| Toyota Celica GT-Four ST165
|}

Racing record

Complete IMC results

Complete WRC results

Complete FIA European Rallycross Cup results

Publications
Björn Waldegård – Rally blev mitt liv, by Waldegård, Björn & Karlsson, Gerhard, Årets Bilsport 1994, 212 pages, Swedish language,

References

External links
 Björn Waldegård RallyBase profile

1943 births
2014 deaths
World Rally Champions
Swedish rally drivers
24 Hours of Le Mans drivers
World Rally Championship drivers
World Sportscar Championship drivers
People from Solna Municipality
Sportspeople from Stockholm County
Porsche Motorsports drivers
Toyota Gazoo Racing drivers